My Mother, the Mermaid (lit. "The Mermaid Princess") is a 2004 South Korean film about a young woman who quarrels with her mother but is somehow transported back in time and sees her parents' courtship. In her youth, her mother was a haenyeo, a traditional freediver.

Synopsis
Na-young (Jeon Do-yeon) is an office worker who lives with her seemingly emotionally non-existent father Jin-kook (Kim Bong-geun), and loud cynical mother Yeon-soon (Go Doo-shim). As time passes, she is becoming more and more like her mother Yeon-soon.

One day, her father suddenly disappears and she skips her international airplane flight to find him. By entering her father's hometown, she is somehow transported back in time to when her parents' relationship was just beginning. She meets her mother, now a poor young woman (Jeon Do-yeon) working hard as a haenyo to send her younger brother to school to get the education she never received. Her father is a charming man (Park Hae-il) who works as a postmaster who delivers mail all over the town where her mother lived. He befriends Yeon-soon and teaches her how to read and write.

Na-young is taken in by the young Yeon-soon and, as they are now roughly the same age, the two become very close. Na-young is able to experience the trials, heartbreaks, and celebrations of Yeon-soon before she herself is suddenly transported back into the present time.

Awards and nominations
2004 Busan Film Critics Awards
 Best Supporting Actress - Go Doo-shim

2004 Blue Dragon Film Awards
 Nomination - Best Film
 Nomination - Best Director - Park Heung-sik 
 Nomination - Best Actress - Jeon Do-yeon
 Nomination - Best Supporting Actress - Go Doo-shim
 Nomination - Best Cinematography - Choi Young-taek

2004 Korean Film Awards
 Best Actress - Jeon Do-yeon
 Best Supporting Actress - Go Doo-shim
 Nomination - Best Actor - Park Hae-il
 Nomination - Best Screenplay  - Park Heung-sik and Song Hye-jin
 Nomination - Best Cinematography - Choi Young-taek
 Nomination - Best Art Direction - Cho Geun-hyun
 Nomination - Best Music - Jo Seong-woo

2004 Director's Cut Awards
 Best Actress - Jeon Do-yeon

2005 Baeksang Arts Awards
 Best Director - Park Heung-sik
 Nomination - Best Actress - Jeon Do-yeon

2005 Chunsa Film Art Awards
 Best Actress - Jeon Do-yeon

2005 Grand Bell Awards
 Nomination - Best Director - Park Heung-sik
 Nomination - Best Actress - Jeon Do-yeon
 Nomination - Best Supporting Actress - Go Doo-shim
 Nomination - Best Screenplay  - Park Heung-sik and Song Hye-jin

References

External links 
  
 
 
 

2004 films
2004 drama films
South Korean drama films
Films about time travel
Films set in Jeju
Films shot in Jeju
2000s Korean-language films
Films directed by Park Heung-sik (born 1965)
2000s South Korean films